A referendum on the armed forces was held in Switzerland on 3 November 1907. Voters were asked whether they approved of the organisation of the federal armed forces. The proposal was approved by 55.2% of voters.

Background
The referendum was an optional referendum, which only a majority of the vote, as opposed to the mandatory referendums, which required a double majority; a majority of the popular vote and majority of the cantons.

Results

References

1907 referendums
1907 in Switzerland
Referendums in Switzerland
Military reform referendums
November 1907 events